Masshouse is a development site in Birmingham, United Kingdom where 13 highrise blocks are being constructed for public services, commerce and residential purposes. When completed, the blocks will have a prominent position on the Eastside skyline.

History
The Masshouse area existed in the Victorian times as nothing else but Masshouse Lane. It was a small lane which was connected to Dale End and the junction at Albert Street and Duddeston Row. The name derives from the establishment of a Roman Catholic chapel (i.e. for the celebration of Mass) there by a Franciscan priest, Leo Randolph, in 1687, followed by a convent in March 1688. Both were burned down by a mob, instigated by the Protestant Lord Delamer, in November 1688.

Showell's Dictionary of Birmingham (1885) describes the building and destruction of the "mass house":

From 1749 to 1943 it was the site of St Bartholomew’s Church, Birmingham.

It was developed in the 1960s into an elevated  road intersection on the A4400 road and was named Masshouse Circus. The area below it was cleared and used as a surface car park. The elevated roadways were made of concrete which created an appearance disliked by locals. Under the roads was a large car park with pedestrian subways. There were six subways:

New Meeting
Henns Walk
James Watt
Chapel Street
Ryder
Hospital

The ring road became known as the "concrete collar" and restricted the expansion of the city centre core beyond it into the east.

In March 2002, the roundabout was demolished to clear the land for development; this was referred to as the "breaking of the concrete collar". The work was carried out by Birse Civils and designed by Gifford & Partners in a contract worth £24.2 million. Over £9 million from the European Regional Development Fund was invested into the project.

A replacement road to connect the Bullring Shopping Centre with Jennens Road was completed and opened in August 2003. However, this was closed for a time due to a number of injuries to pedestrians. The road (B4100, Moor Street Queensway) is now open although a potential accident spot remains as buses using the Moor Street Queensway bus lane eastbound have to go around a pedestrian crossing point to continue along Queensway at Masshouse. However, the land was left as a car park for a number of years as plans and designs for the development were created. Pieces of the rubble collected from the demolished structure, were put on sale by the Birmingham branch of Friends of the Earth with a price tag of 50p per piece.

Development

Masshouse is now cleared and ready for development with the largest of the three sites being used as a temporary car park. It has been separated into two phases with Phase 1 retaining the Masshouse name and the other plot, Phase 2, being called City Park Gate, named after the new Eastside City Park to be constructed next to it.

Phase 1 will stretch from the McLaren Building to the Park Street. The scheme is being developed by David McLean Developments and has been designed by Edward Cullinan Architects. The entire scheme is expected to cost £350 million and provide  of space.

The planning application for Block I was submitted in October 2004. Block I has been completed and the first residents moved into the building in December 2006. Construction of the 14-storey building cost £30 million and consists of 173 studio, one and two-bedroom apartments. Over 50% of the building's 173 apartments were sold in the first week of release. They consist of a complex mixture of finishes with some containing black polished bands bounded by a white concrete frame and finished to two different levels of exposure. The top floor penthouse apartments are clad with grey polished pre-cast panels. Many of the main cladding panels are either concave or convex with pointed ends and most will be pre-fitted with windows at the Techrete factory to accelerate the construction process.

The application consisted of four buildings for retail, office, hotel and residential use.

The entire scheme aims to create  of Grade A office accommodation, 550 high specification apartments, Ground floor cafes, restaurants and retail units, Two new public squares, with traffic free landscaped areas, water features and public art and 800 car parking spaces.

In January 2010, Braemar Estates (Residential) Ltd were appointed as property managers to Block I at Masshouse.

Block M (Hive)

Masshouse submitted plans for a second residential building named Block M in August 2006. Construction commenced in August 2007 and was due for completion in 2009 however, the collapse of development partner David McLean in 2008 caused the construction to be put on hold. In 2009 McLaren were appointed to take over from David McLean and construction recommenced and completed in 2011. The development is estimated to have cost £23 million and consists of 167 studio, one and two bedroom apartments with 12 apartments per floor over 14 floors. The apartments went on sale in Spring 2011 under the name Hive, studio apartments start at £90,000 and one bedroom apartments start at £110,000. Although the apartments are on sale hard landscaping at the eastern side is incomplete and due to delays to the Magistrates Court project the western side remains as derelict land. All properties are powered by Birmingham District Energy Company (BDEC), the first time residential homes in the city have benefited from the city's district water heating system the apartments receive power from the new Jennens Road Energy Centre on Aston University’s campus.

See also
 Big City Plan
 Eastside, Birmingham

References

External links
 Official Masshouse site
 Masshouse Square on Emporis

Areas of Birmingham, West Midlands
Buildings and structures in Birmingham, West Midlands